A real square matrix  is monotone (in the sense of Collatz) if for all real vectors ,  implies , where  is the element-wise order on .

Properties

A monotone matrix is nonsingular.

Let  be a real square matrix.  is monotone if and only if .

Proof: Suppose  is monotone. Then,  is the -th standard basis vector, and hence  by monotonicity. For the reverse direction, suppose  admits an inverse such that .

Examples

The matrix  is monotone, with inverse .
In fact, this matrix is an M-matrix (i.e., a monotone L-matrix).

Note, however, that not all monotone matrices are M-matrices.

See also
 M-matrix
 Weakly chained diagonally dominant matrix

References

Matrices